Lewis Meltzer (January 28, 1911 – February 23, 1995) was an American screenwriter and brother of actor Sid Melton. He died in 1995.

Select filmography 

 The Beat Generation (1959)
 High School Confidential! (1958)
 The Brothers Rico (1957)
 Autumn Leaves (1956)
 The Man with the Golden Arm (1955)
 Shark River (1953)
 Desert Legion (1953)
 The Jazz Singer (1952)
 Thunder in the East (1951)
 Along the Great Divide (1951)
 Comanche Territory (1950)
 The Lady Gambles (1949)
 Texas, Brooklyn & Heaven (1948)
 Man-Eater of Kumaon (1948)
 Ladies' Man (1947)
 Once Upon a Time (1944)
 Destroyer (1943)
 First Comes Courage (1943)
 The Tuttles of Tahiti (1942)
 New York Town (1941)
 Texas (1941)
 The Lady in Question (1940)
 Those High Grey Walls (1939)
 Golden Boy (1939)

References

External links
 

1911 births
1995 deaths
Screenwriters from New York (state)